James Smith Candlish (1835–1897) was a  Scottish minister of the Free Church of Scotland who was a professor of theology in Glasgow.

Life
He was born on 14 December 1835 at 9 Castle Street in Edinburgh's New Town the son of Jessie Brock and her husband, Rev Robert Smith Candlish. He was named after a recently deceased uncle, James Smith Candlish (1800–1829). He was educated at Edinburgh Academy. He then took a general degree at the University of Edinburgh graduating with an MA in 1858 then studied divinity at New College, Edinburgh. He spent some time in Europe studying at Berlin and Erlangen University.

At the Disruption of 1843, his father was one of the leading figures in the creation of the Free Church of Scotland.

James was ordained as a Free Church of Scotland minister at Logiealmond in 1863. He was translated to Aberdeen East in 1868.

In 1872, he became Professor of Systematic Theology at the Free Church College in Glasgow. He lived at 5 Royal Circus.

The University of Glasgow awarded him an honorary doctorate (DD) in 1874. He famously defended the controversial views of Prof Robertson Smith.

He died on 7 March 1897 at the Free Church manse in Tarbolton.

Family

In 1872, he married Ann Elizabeth Simpson (1834–1904), daughter of Dr Simpson of Kintore, at Old Machar in Aberdeen.

Publications

The Kingdom of God: Biblically and Historically Considered
The Christian Sacraments
The Christian Doctrine of God
The Work of the Holy Spirit
The Biblical Doctrine of Sin
The Epistle to the Ephesians
The Christian Salvation: Lectures on the Work of Christ

References

1835 births
1897 deaths
Clergy from Edinburgh
People educated at Edinburgh Academy
Alumni of the University of Edinburgh
19th-century Ministers of the Free Church of Scotland